End of the Line is a 1987 American drama film directed by Jay Russell in his directorial debut. Produced by Lewis M. Allen, Peter Newman and Mary Steenburgen, the film was shot in Arkansas.

Plot

Leo Pickett and Will Haney, railroad workers in Clifford, Arkansas, find out the parent company of the Southland railroad is about to close their yard and layoff the employees, switching all future shipments to the air freight business.

In a last-ditch effort to save their jobs, the two men "borrow" a locomotive and drive it from Clifford, Arkansas, to Chicago, Illinois, to make their case to Thomas G. Clinton, the railroad's Chairman of the Board.

Cast

Production
End of the Line was produced with the cooperation of the Missouri Pacific Railroad, which provide technical assistance to production crews as well as the contribution of multiple sets of rolling stock and locomotives. All Southland rolling stock and locomotives, including trackage rights for filming rights was provided by the Missouri Pacific, as well as limited assistance by the Union Pacific, which approved use of some rolling stock, trackage, and locomotives for completion of the film.

References

External links
 
 
 

1987 films
1987 drama films
American drama films
Films directed by Jay Russell
Films set in Arkansas
Films shot in Arkansas
Rail transport films
1987 directorial debut films
1980s English-language films
1980s American films